The last year of the film industry where King Norodom Sihanouk encourage the film industry. Of the 20 films listed, 4 films are in existence, 4 have been remade, and 12 have not yet been remade:

Highest-grossing 
The ten highest-grossing films at the Cambodian Box Office in 1969:

1969

References 
 

1969
Films
Cambodian